Greatest Hits is a 2006 compilation album by the punk rock band Ramones. It was issued one year after the box set Weird Tales of the Ramones, and four years after the single-disc collection Loud, Fast Ramones: Their Toughest Hits. The album contains songs recorded during 1976–1989.

Track listing

Certifications

References

2006 greatest hits albums
Rhino Records compilation albums
Ramones compilation albums
Albums produced by Tommy Ramone
Albums produced by Ed Stasium
Albums produced by Craig Leon
Albums produced by Tony Bongiovi